Kevin Saxelby (born 23 February 1959 in Worksop) is an English former first-class cricketer active 1978–90 who played for Nottinghamshire (awarded county cap 1984).

References

External links

1959 births
English cricketers
Nottinghamshire cricketers
Living people
Sportspeople from Worksop
Cricketers from Nottinghamshire
20th-century English people